Invasion of Privacy is the debut studio album by American rapper Cardi B. It was released on April 6, 2018, by Atlantic Records. Primarily a hip hop record, Invasion of Privacy also includes trap, Latin trap and R&B. It features production from 30 Roc, Andrew Watt, Benny Blanco, Boi-1da, Craig Kallman, Cubeatz, DJ Mustard, Frank Dukes, J. White Did It, Keyz, Murda Beatz, Needlz, Tainy, and Vinylz, among others. The album features guest appearances by Migos, Chance the Rapper, Kehlani, SZA, 21 Savage, J Balvin, Bad Bunny, and YG.

The album debuted atop the US Billboard 200, earning 255,000 album-equivalent units in its first week, with 103,000 coming from pure album sales. It has been certified triple platinum by the Recording Industry Association of America (RIAA). It produced five singles—"Bodak Yellow", "Bartier Cardi" featuring 21 Savage, "Be Careful", "I Like It" with Bad Bunny and J Balvin, and "Ring" featuring Kehlani. Both Diamond-certified singles "Bodak Yellow" and "I Like It" reached number one on the Billboard Hot 100, making her the first female rapper to achieve multiple chart-toppers. Upon release, the album set multiple streaming records, including being the first album by a female artist to debut with more than 100 million streams on Apple Music, while she became the first female artist to chart thirteen songs simultaneously on the Hot 100. It also became the first album in music history to have all its tracks certified platinum or higher by the RIAA. It was the top female rap album of the 2010s, according to the Billboard 200 decade-end chart. It broke the record for longest-charting album by a female rapper on the Billboard 200, surpassing The Miseducation of Lauryn Hill, and has spent three full years on the chart. In December 2019, it was the most-streamed female rap album on Spotify and Apple Music, and most-viewed female rap album on YouTube. According to The Recording Academy, it is the best-selling female rap album of the 2010s.

Invasion of Privacy was met with critical acclaim. A number of music publications included it among their lists of best albums of the year, with Rolling Stone and Time listing it at number one. Several publications ranked it among the best albums of the 2010s (decade) as well, with Rolling Stone placing it 34th. Among its accolades, it won Best Rap Album at the 61st Annual Grammy Awards, with Cardi B becoming the first female rapper to win the category as a solo artist. It was also nominated for Album of the Year, with "I Like It" being nominated for Record of the Year and "Be Careful" for Best Rap Performance. It became the first female rap album in fifteen years to be nominated for Album of the Year. "Bodak Yellow" was nominated for Best Rap Song and Best Rap Performance for the previous ceremony. At the 2019 BET Awards, Invasion of Privacy won the BET Award for Album of the Year.

The album was made available for streaming and digital download on April 5, 2018, but was not available on any physical format upon its initial release. The album was eventually released on vinyl on December 7, 2018, and its CD release—initially scheduled for September 28, 2018—was released on February 22, 2019.

Background
Prior to the release of the album, "Bodak Yellow" reached number one on the US Billboard Hot 100, while several collaborations also reached the top 10. Those singles set multiple chart records, including making her the first female rapper to land her first three entries in the top 10 of the Hot 100, and the first female artist to achieve the same on the Hot R&B/Hip-Hop Songs chart. With her collaboration with Bruno Mars, "Finesse (Remix)", she became the first woman to have five top 10 singles simultaneously on the Hot R&B/Hip-Hop Songs. In March 2018, Cardi announced at the iHeartRadio Music Awards that the album will be released in April. She announced the release date and the title posting the album artwork in her social media pages.

Recording and production
Invasion of Privacy was recorded from 2017 until early 2018. It features production from 30 Roc, Allen Ritter, Andrew Watt, Ayo, Benny Blanco, Boi-1da, Cassius Jay, Cheeze Beatz, Craig Kallman, Cubeatz, DJ Mustard, DJ Official, DJ SwanQo, Frank Dukes, Invincible, J. White, Keyz, Klenard Raphael, Murda Beatz, Matt Allen, Needlz, NES, Nonstop Da Hitman, Scribz Riley, Tainy and Vinylz, among others.

Music and lyrics
Primarily a hip hop album, Invasion of Privacy also comprises trap, Latin music and R&B, while its lyrical themes include fame, success, wealth, sex, and feminism, as well as Cardi B's past. The album opens with "Get Up 10", which speaks about Cardi B's rise to fame. It is followed by a trap song "Drip", which features a guest appearance by Migos, and speaks about jewelry, wealth, and Cardi B and Migos' status. The third track "Bickenhead" has a feminist theme; its title refers to women who work hard for money.

A hip hop and trap song "Bodak Yellow" follows, on which Cardi B confronts her enemies and makes statements such as "I don't dance now, I make money moves", referring to her past, as she used to work as a stripper before rising to fame. On the fourth track "Be Careful", Cardi B performs the hook using a softly sung vocal style over a "laidback" beat. The song also comprises "flickering" hi-hats and "slick" synths. Lyrically, "Be Careful" is a song about infidelity, where the protagonist warns her cheating partner and asks him to treat her better. During an interview, Cardi B stated that she drew inspiration from past relationships, while denying that the song was directed at her fiancé Offset.

The sixth track "Best Life" features a guest appearance by Chance the Rapper; the lyrics discuss the power of God and positive thinking. It's followed by "I Like It", a bilingual (English and Spanish) latin trap song featuring Bad Bunny and J Balvin. Invasion of Privacy also contains two R&B mid-tempo songs–"Ring" (featuring Kehlani) and "Thru Your Phone"–which both lyrically show Cardi B's emotional vulnerability.

"Ring" is followed by three hip hop and trap songs: "Money Bag", "Bartier Cardi" (featuring 21 Savage), and "She Bad" (with YG). On "Bartier Cardi", Cardi B raps about her attraction to diamonds, sports cars and sex, while 21 Savage raps about a similar theme from a male perspective.

Release and promotion
Prior to the release of Invasion of Privacy, Cardi B promoted its lead single "Bodak Yellow" in several live performances, including at the BET Awards 2017 afterparty on June 25, 2017, during the 2017 MTV Video Music Awards pre-show on August 27, at the 2017 BET Hip Hop Awards on October 6, and on Jimmy Kimmel Live! on October 18.

While accepting her iHeartRadio Music Award for Best New Artist at the 2018 iHeartRadio Music Awards on March 11, 2018, Cardi B revealed that Invasion of Privacy would be released in April 2018. On March 26, 2018, she revealed both the official artwork and title for the album. The album was made available for streaming on April 5, 2018, through Atlantic Records, and was released for digital download worldwide the following day.

On April 7, 2018, Cardi B performed the first three singles on Saturday Night Live. On April 9, she co-hosted The Tonight Show Starring Jimmy Fallon, becoming the first person ever to co-host the show. Cardi B also performed during the Coachella Valley Music and Arts Festival on April 15 and April 20, 2018. She also performed at the Broccoli City Festival 2018 on April 28, 2018; she was also supposed to perform at the Wireless Festival in July, however, the performance was cancelled due to her pregnancy. Her summer tour in support of the album, which would run from May 4 until July 29, 2018, in the United States, Norway and Ireland, and all performances until September were also cancelled.

Cardi B was also originally scheduled to be the opening act on Bruno Mars's 24K Magic World Tour in North America during September and October 2018, however, she withdrew as she just had her daughter, Kulture.

Singles
The album's lead single, "Bodak Yellow", was released on June 16, 2017. It topped the US Billboard Hot 100 chart for three weeks. Cardi B became the first female rapper to have a song certified Diamond by the RIAA when "Bodak Yellow" received the certification in March 2021.

"Bartier Cardi" was released on December 22, 2017, as the second single and features rapper 21 Savage. It peaked at number 14 on the US Billboard Hot 100 and was certified triple platinum by the RIAA.

"Be Careful" was released as the third single on March 30, 2018. It peaked at number 11 on the US Billboard Hot 100 and was certified triple platinum by the RIAA.

"Drip" featuring Migos was released as a promotional single on April 4, 2018, despite being released to Australian radio on April 6, 2018. It peaked at number 21 on the US Billboard Hot 100. The song has been certified platinum by the RIAA.

"I Like It", with Bad Bunny and J Balvin, debuted at number eight on the Hot 100 following the album's release. It was distributed to urban contemporary and contemporary hit radio as the album's fourth single on May 25, 2018, and several days later, the song's music video premiered on Cardi B's YouTube channel. After being released as a single, it topped the Billboard Hot 100 chart, making Cardi the first female rapper with multiple number one singles on the chart's history. The single has been certified Diamond by the RIAA, becoming the second song from the album to receive this certification, following "Bodak Yellow, and making Cardi B the first female rapper with three Diamond songs. "I Like It" and "Bodak Yellow" made Cardi B the only female rapper to have two videos on her YouTube channel with more than 1 billion views.

"Ring", featuring Kehlani, impacted US urban contemporary radio on August 28, 2018, as the fifth single. Previously, it had entered at number 28 on the Hot 100 as an album track following the album's release. The single has been certified double platinum by the RIAA.

Critical reception

Invasion of Privacy received widespread acclaim from music critics. At Metacritic, which assigns a normalized rating out of 100 to reviews from mainstream publications, the album received an average score of 84, based on 24 reviews, indicating "universal acclaim". Ben Beaumont-Thomas of The Guardian gave Invasion of Privacy four out of five stars, and called it "a magnificent debut that fuses vulnerability, sexual voraciousness, paranoia, and party music" and wrote that the album "shows the rapper is capable of far more than punchy put-downs". For Exclaim!, Erin Lowers scored the album a 9 out of 10, noting that her softer singles add "a new dimension" to her artistry, and adding that the release "feels like her 'Lemonade' moment, one that magnifies her insecurities for public consumption."

Maeve McDermott of USA Today gave the album another positive review, stating that "at 13 tracks, Invasion of Privacy isn't overstuffed with endless filler tracks like many releases by Cardi's rap peers. Leave it to Cardi, marketing queen, to know that fans get exhausted when performers overstay their welcome in attempts to rack up streaming numbers. The hip hop star likely doesn't have to worry about that, considering her album seems destined for charts success, if "Bodak Yellow"'s record-breaking last year was any indication." Jem Aswad of Variety called it "one of the most powerful debuts of this millennium" and praised its opening number "Get Up 10" as an "empowering opening autobiographical testimonial," though he also felt "in a couple of cases the featured artists run off with the song so completely that it feels like Cardi is a guest on her own album." Eleanor Halls of GQ wrote: "Invasion of Privacy proves "Bodak Yellow" was far from a summer one-hit wonder. These money moves are played for the long game."

Rob Sheffield of Rolling Stone described the album as "lavishly emotional, intimately personal, wildly funny," and concluded "Invasion proves she's here to stay." For Pitchfork, Sheldon Pearce awarded the album "Best New Music", writing that "Cardi B's remarkable debut places her, without a doubt, in the pantheon of great rappers. It is both brazen and vulnerable, filled with wild amounts of personality, style, and craft". Jon Caramanica of The New York Times noted, "she is more versatile than most rappers or pop stars of any stripe," adding, "[it] is also, notably, a hip-hop album that doesn't sound like any of its temporal peers."

Chris Richards of The Washington Post commented: "She seems to be telling one long story here — about self-empowerment, beating the odds, transcendence — but the force of Cardi's narrative resides in the sound of her voice as much as it does in her words. You can hear it during the album's grand finale, "I Do," when she asks, "My little 15 minutes lasted long as hell, huh?" What a victory speech. Close your eyes and you might feel the confetti falling on your shoulders, too." Carrie Battan of The New Yorker complimented Invasion of Privacy by saying "[it] is as studious as it is bombastic."

Time magazine named Invasion of Privacy the best album of 2018, stating, "Cardi's debut doesn't just earn her a seat at hip-hop's table—it marks her as a singular voice."

Accolades
A number of music publications included Invasion of Privacy among their top 10 albums of the year lists, with Rolling Stone and Time listing it at number one. In 2019, Rolling Stone and Pitchfork listed the album as one of the greatest albums of the decade, placing it at number 34 and 73, respectively. In 2022, Rolling Stone ranked the album at number 20 on its list of "100 Best Debut Albums of All Time".

All genres (2018)

 1st – Capital XTRA
 1st – Entertainment Tonight
 1st – The Ringer
 1st – Rob Sheffield, Rolling Stone
 1st – Staff, Rolling Stone
 1st – Time
 2nd – Billboard
 2nd – Entertainment Weekly
 2nd – Esquire
 3rd – A.Side
 3rd – Dagbladet
 3rd – Highsnobiety
 3rd – Metro Times
 3rd – The New Zealand Herald
 3rd – Okayplayer

Hip-hop and rap (2018)

 1st – Rolling Stone
 1st – BrooklynVegan
 1st – Exclaim!
 1st – Stereogum
 2nd – Billboard
 3rd – NPR Music
 4th – Salon
 5th – Paste
 6th – The Austin Chronicle
 7th – Revolt TV
 9th – PopMatters
 10th – HipHopDX
 Top 10 (unordered list) – Yardbarker
 Top 50 (unordered list) – XXL
 Best of 2018 (unordered list) – AllMusic
 Best of 2018 (unordered list) – The A.V. Club
 Best of 2018 (unordered list) – Pitchfork

Pop (2018)
 4th – The Austin Chronicle

All-genres (decade)
8th – Spin
13th – Billboard
34th – Rolling Stone
35th – NME
56th – Stereogum
58th –  Slant
67th – Paste
73rd – Pitchfork
79th – BrooklynVegan
83rd – Consequence of Sound

Awards and nominations

Commercial performance
Invasion of Privacy was certified gold by the Recording Industry Association of America (RIAA) on the day of its release due to a technicality that incorporates the track-equivalent units moved by its previously released singles "Bodak Yellow" and "Bartier Cardi". It was certified double platinum on October 3, 2018, and triple platinum on April 3, 2019, following its physical release on CD.

On December 20, 2018, all thirteen tracks were certified gold or higher by the RIAA, making her the first female artist to achieve such feat, and third overall. On March 24, 2022, Invasion of Privacy became the first album to have all of its tracks certified platinum or higher by the RIAA.

On April 13, 2018, Apple Music announced that Invasion of Privacy set a new record for the most streamed album by a female artist in a single week with over a hundred million streams. The album debuted at number one on the US Billboard 200 chart, moving 255,000 album-equivalent units with 103,000 coming from pure album sales in its first week. It achieved the largest on-demand audio streaming week ever for an album by a woman with 202.6 million streams. At the time of its release, it became the second biggest first-week sales of 2018. Cardi B became the fifth female rapper to top the chart. On the US Billboard Hot 100 chart dated April 21, Cardi B listed 13 songs, with 12 of them being songs from Invasion of Privacy, thus surpassing Beyoncé for the most simultaneous songs on the chart by a solo female artist. The record was later broken by Billie Eilish in 2019 when 12 tracks from her album When We All Fall Asleep, Where Do We Go? and two additional singles charted on the Hot 100 in a single week. In its second week, the album fell to number two on the chart, earning an additional 129,000 units, dropping forty-nine percent from the first week. In its third week, the album remained at number two with over 91,000 units, dropping thirty percent from the previous week. It has spent twenty one consecutive weeks within the top ten on the chart, which is the most weeks for a female rap album— including eight non-consecutive weeks within the top five. It also spent twenty two consecutive weeks within the top ten on the Top R&B/Hip Hop chart. As of July 6, 2018, Invasion of Privacy is the best-performing female album of 2018 and the third overall in the United States. The album remained the largest female debut of 2018 in the country until September 2018, with the release of Carrie Underwood's Cry Pretty. In the US, Invasion of Privacy was the fourth best selling album of 2018 with 2,060,000 album-equivalent units, the best selling for a female artist that year.

In December 2019, it became the most-streamed album by a female rapper ever in Spotify. In January 2020, it became the longest-charting debut album by a female rapper on the Billboard 200, surpassing Lauryn Hill's The Miseducation of Lauryn Hill (1998). In August 2020, it became the longest-charting album by a female rapper, surpassing 124 weeks. It surpassed 150 weeks in the chart in February 2021.

Invasion of Privacy also debuted atop the Canadian Albums Chart, moving 12,000 album-equivalent units. It was certified Platinum by Music Canada for shipments of 80,000 copies. The album was a commercial success internationally as well, peaking within the top ten on charts in Australia, Denmark, Estonia, Finland, Flanders, Iceland, Ireland, the Netherlands, New Zealand, Norway, Sweden, and the United Kingdom.

It was the third most streamed album of 2018 in Apple Music globally, being the highest for a female artist. It was the tenth most streamed album in Canada on the streaming service. It was also the fifth most streamed album in that platform ever, being the highest for a female artist. In Spotify, it was the fourth most streamed album of the year in the United States, also being the highest for a female artist, with Cardi being the most streamed female artist. In 2020, Spotify's RapCaviar announced Cardi B and Drake as the top performers on the playlist since its creation.

Legacy
Spin staff credited the album for opening "the table to a new generation of pop artists remaking American music in their own image and accents. And Cardi will remain front-and-center." The magazine further added that Invasion of Privacy is an "invitation into [her] world of blood, sweat, and tears... it's a rebuke to much of what passes for chart-focused rap, where the artist's persona is crafted for maximum exposure. Instead, Cardi B recognized that POC artists no longer need to pander or soften themselves in order to become household names." In 2019, Consequence of Sound editors wrote "her authenticity and charisma are constants that reinforce her standing as one of the most formidable hip-hop artists of the decade," and NME stated that the album secured "her crown as the new Queen of Rap." In a book excerpt published in Jezebel of The Motherlode (2021) by Clover Hope, the author wrote that Invasion of Privacy was "the best rap debut in years and belongs in the canon along with Lil' Kim's Hard Core and Lauryn Hill's The Miseducation of Lauryn Hill," and stated that the album "jump-started a new era for women rappers in which success felt much more tangible" as Cardi B "multiplied the wealth of talent and resurrected the idea that numerous women who controlled their own stories could dominate rap at once... Never again would there only be one."

Track listing
Credits adapted from Tidal.

Notes
  signifies a co-producer
  signifies an additional producer
 "I Like It" features additional background vocals by Andrew Tinker, Holly Seeley, Michael Romero, Nick Seeley and Sarah Sellers
 "Thru Your Phone" features background vocals by Andrew Watt and uncredited vocals by Ali Tamposi

Sample credits
 "Get Up 10" contains an interpolation of "Dreams and Nightmares", performed by Meek Mill and written by Maurice Jordan, Jermaine Preyan, Robert Williams and Anthony Tucker.
 "Bickenhead" contains a sample of "Chickenhead", written by Jordan Houston, Paul Beauregard and Todd Shaw, performed by Project Pat.
 "Bodak Yellow" contains an interpolation from "No Flockin", performed by Kodak Black.
 "Be Careful" contains an interpolation from "Ex-Factor", written and performed by Lauryn Hill. 
 "I Like It" contains a sample from "I Like It Like That", written by Tony Pabon and Manny Rodriguez, and performed by Pete Rodriguez.

Personnel
Credits adapted from Tidal.

Performance

 Cardi B – primary artist
 Migos – featured artist
 Chance the Rapper – featured artist
 Bad Bunny – artist 
 J Balvin – artist 
 Kehlani – featured artist
 21 Savage – featured artist
 YG – artist
 SZA – featured artist
 Ali Tamposi – uncredited vocals 
 Holly Seeley – background vocals 
 Nick Seeley – background vocals 
 Michael Romero – background vocals 
 Andrew Tinker – background vocals 
 Sarah Sellers – background vocals 
 Andrew Watt – background vocals

Instrumentation

 Juan Chavez – trumpets 
 Andrew Watt – guitar

Production

 Darrale Jones – executive production
 Brooklyn Johnny – executive production
 Craig Kallman – executive production, production 
 DJ SwanQo – production 
 Matt Allen – production 
 Cassius Jay – production 
 Nonstop Da Hitman – production 
 Ayo & Keys – production 
 NES – production 
 J. White Did It – production 
 Boi-1da – production 
 Frank Dukes – production 
 Kuk Harrell – production 
 Vinylz – production 
 Simone Torres – production 
 Allen Ritter – production 
 Tainy – production 
 Needlz – production 
 Scribz Riley – production 
 30 Roc – production 
 Cheeze Beatz – production 
 DJ Mustard – production 
 DJ Official – production 
 Andrew Watt – production 
 Benny Blanco – production , keyboards 
 Murda Beatz – production 
 Nick Seeley – additional production 
 Louis Bell – additional production 
 Laquan Green – co-production 
 Invincible – co-production 
 Avery Earls – production coordinator 
 Carlyn Calder – production coordinator 
 Donnie Meadows – production coordinator 
 Andrew Luftman – production coordinator 
 Sarah Shelton – production coordinator 
 Sofia Yen – production coordinator 
 Zvi Edelman – production coordinator

Technical

 DJ SwanQo – programming 
 Matt Allen – programming 
 Cassius Jay – programming 
 Max Lord - recording 
 Nonstop Da Hitman – programming 
 Ayo & Keys – programming 
 NES – programming 
 J. White Did It – programming 
 Laquan Green – programming 
 Boi-1da – programming 
 Frank Dukes – programming 
 Vinylz – programming 
 Allen Ritter – programming 
 Craig Kallman – programming 
 Invincible – programming 
 Tainy – programming 
 Needlz – programming 
 Scribz Riley – programming 
 30 Roc – programming 
 Cheeze Beatz – programming 
 DJ Mustard – programming 
 DJ Official – programming 
 Andrew Watt – programming 
 Benny Blanco – programming 
 Murda Beatz – programming 
 Nick Seeley – additional programming 
 David Rodriguez – engineering 
 Geoff Swan – engineering 
 Michael Freeman – engineering 
 Ebonie Smith – engineering assistance 
 Evan LaRay – recording , engineering 
 Louie Gomez – additional recording 
 Peter Kim – additional recording 
 DJ SwanQo – additional recording 
 Joel Iglesias – additional recording 
 Leslie Brathwaite – mixing 
 MixedByAli – mixing 
 Mark Stent – mixing 
 Colin Leonard – mastering

Miscellaneous

 Craig Kallman – editing 
 DJ SwanQo – editing 
 Ebonie Smith – editing 
 Joe Pomarico – editing 
 Kuk Harrell – editing 
 Louie Gomez – editing 
 Peter Kim – editing

Artwork and marketing

 Darrale Jones – A&R direction
 Brooklyn Johnn – A&R direction
 Craig Kallman – A&R direction
 Lanre Gaba – A&R project management
 Marsha St. Hubert – marketing direction
 Ashley Kalmanowitz – publicity
 Brian Rainney – packaging production
 Jora Frantzis – photography
 Nicholas Fulcher – art direction & design

Charts

Weekly charts

Year-end charts

Decade-end charts

Certifications

Release history

Notes

References

External links
 
 
 

2018 debut albums
Atlantic Records albums
Cardi B albums
Albums produced by Andrew Watt (record producer)
Albums produced by Benny Blanco
Albums produced by Boi-1da
Albums produced by DJ Mustard
Albums produced by Frank Dukes
Albums produced by Louis Bell
Albums produced by Murda Beatz
Albums produced by Vinylz
Albums produced by Cubeatz
Grammy Award for Best Rap Album
Albums produced by Craig Kallman
Albums produced by Allen Ritter
Albums produced by J. White Did It